Lieutenant Commander Zachary Lansdowne, USN (December 1, 1888 – September 3, 1925) was a United States Navy officer and early Naval aviator who contributed to the development of the Navy's first lighter-than-air craft.  He earned the Navy Cross for his participation in the first transoceanic airship flight while assigned to the British R34 in 1919. He later commanded the USS Shenandoah (ZR-1), which was the first rigid airship to complete a flight across North America. He was killed in the crash of the Shenandoah.

Biography
Born in Greenville, Ohio, Lansdowne was appointed to the United States Naval Academy September 2, 1905 and commissioned Ensign June 5, 1911.  He subsequently served on the destroyer , and in the Ohio Naval Militia.  After completing his aviation training, he became Naval Aviator 105.

Lansdowne was assigned to duty with the Royal Naval Air Service during and after World War I, to study dirigibles.  He was awarded the Navy Cross "for distinguished service...as one of the crew of the British airship R-34, which in July 1919, made the first successful nonstop passage from England to the United States." 
He married Margaret "Betsy" Kennedy Ross (September 30, 1902 – June 9, 1982) on December 7, 1921, in Washington D.C. They had two children. She remarried after Lansdowne's death.

On February 11, 1924, Lansdowne took command of the rigid lighter-than-air ship, and was killed when she crashed at Ava, Ohio, September 3, 1925. He was buried later that month in section four at Arlington National Cemetery.

The crash of the Shenandoah was the trigger for United States Army Colonel Billy Mitchell to heavily criticize the leadership of both the Army and the Navy, leading directly to his court-martial for insubordination and the end of his military career.

Lansdowne was played by Jack Lord in the 1955 film The Court-Martial of Billy Mitchell.

Lansdowne's house in Greenville still stands; it is listed on the National Register of Historic Places.

Namesake
The , a Gleaves-class destroyer, and Lansdowne Airport in Youngstown, Ohio were named in Lansdowne's honor. A street in Carle Place, New York was also named in his honor.

See also
List of people on the cover of Time Magazine: 1920s

References

Further reading
 Keirns, Aaron J., and Aaron J. Keirns. Airship Disaster: The Crash of the USS Shenandoah. Howard, Ohio: Little River Pub, 2000.

External links

     history.navy.mil: USS Lansdowne
Appendix I. "The History of Naval Aviator and Naval Aviation Pilot Designations and Numbers, The Training of Naval Aviators and the Number Trained (Designated)." Grossnick, Roy et al. History of United States Naval Aviation 1910-1995. Washington, D.C.: Naval Historical Center, 1997, p. 404.

1888 births
1925 deaths
Accidental deaths in Ohio
Airship aviators
Airships of the United States Navy
Aviators killed in aviation accidents or incidents in the United States
Burials at Arlington National Cemetery
People from Greenville, Ohio
Recipients of the Navy Cross (United States)
United States Naval Aviators
United States Navy officers
Victims of aviation accidents or incidents in 1925
Military personnel from Ohio
Aviators from Ohio